Arno Stern (born June 23, 1924) is a German-born French pedagogue and researcher.

Life 
Stern was born on June 23, 1924 in Kassel, Hesse, Germany. He attended a school there for three years before emigrating to France with his parents after Hitler came to power. After the outbreak of World War II, the family continued to flee to Switzerland. Together with around 300 other refugees, Stern spent his youth there in a makeshift factory building until the end of the war. During this internment period, the refugees were looked after by aid agencies that provided them with books, including about art history. He was a refugee for 12 years. Stern also used his limited free time to draw in these years. After years of internment and statelessness, Stern returned to France with his family after the war and became a French citizen.

He has a spouse named Michéle Stern as well as two sons (Bertrand Stern (born 1948) and André Stern (born 1971)) and a daughter (Elénore Stern (born 1978 or 1979)). His first son, Bertrand, went to school but didn't like it there, which is why his later born children were unschooled.

Over time, the media became aware of Stern's work. He was interviewed several times, reports were made and he wrote articles about his work.

UNESCO also became aware of Stern and delegated him as an expert to the first international congress on art education in Bristol. On September 9, 2019, Stern was honored by UNESCO and the Paris-Sorbonne University.

Writings 

 Der Malort. With Eléonore Stern (images). Daimon, Einsiedeln 1998, .
 Die natürliche Spur. Wenn die Mal-Lust nicht zu Werken führt. Verlag Mit Kindern wachsen, Freiburg 2001; La traccia naturale: quando il piacere di dipingere non si trasforma in opera, Luni, Milano 1997,   (Italian).
 Das Malspiel und die natürliche Spur. Malort, Malspiel und die Formulation. Drachen Verlag, Klein Jasedow 2005, : Neuausgabe 2012, .
 Die Expression. Der Mensch zwischen Kommunikation und Ausdruck. Classen, Zürich 1994, ; Klotz, Eschborn 2008, .
 With André Stern: Mein Vater, mein Freund – das Geheimnis glücklicher Söhne. Zabert-Sandmann, München 2011, .
 (As publisher), mit Herbert Kalmann: Erinnerungen an Europa. 1933 - 1949. SichVerlag, Magdeburg 2012. .
 Wie man Kinderbilder nicht betrachten soll. Zabert-Sandmann, München 2012, .
 Die Spur. Gewesenes Kindsein. Klotz, Magdeburg 2014, .
 Das Malspiel und die Kunst des Dienens. Die Wiederentdeckung des Spontanen. Drachen, Klein Jasedow 2015, .
 Das Malspiel und das Leben. Erinnerungen, Betrachtungen, Fragmente. Drachen, Klein Jasedow 2018, .

Literature 
André Stern: Und ich war nie in der Schule: Geschichte eines glücklichen Kindes, Kindle Edition, Zabert Sandmann, München 2011; Lizenzausgabe: Herder, Freiburg im Breisgau, 2013,  (with André Stern)

Reception 

 Alphabet

References

External links 
 Personal website
Arno Stern on YouTube

German art educators
Emigrants from Nazi Germany to France
1924 births
Living people